Jump shot or jumpshot may refer to:

 , in cue sports such as pool (pocket billiards), a shot in which the cue ball is intentionally jumped into the air to clear an obstacle (usually an object ball)
 Jump shot (basketball), an attempt to score in basketball by jumping, usually straight up, and in mid-jump, propelling the ball in an arc into the basket, unlike a normal shot in which the player's feet stay on the ground
 "Jumpshot" (song), 2016 song by American singer Dawin
 "Jump Shots", 2016 song by Reks from his album The Greatest X